Football is the number one sport in Botswana. It is organized by the Botswana Football Association. By October 2007, there are about 348 men's clubs registered. The number of woman's teams organized in the regional leagues by the season of 2021/22  is 88. The men's national team have not yet enjoyed any tangible success on the field. The women's team have achieved their greatest success by qualifying for the Africa Cup of Nations for the first time, where they've reached the first knockout stage. There are less than a handful of male and female players based outside of their home country, the most famous being forward Dipsy Selolwane.

Men's League System 
There are three main leagues: Botswana Premier League (16 clubs), Botswana First Division North (12 clubs), and Botswana First Division South (12 clubs).

Women's League System 
There are several regional leagues: Boteti Regional Women's League, Central North Women's League, Francistown Regional Women's League, Gaborone Women's League, Kgatleng Regional Women's League, Kweneng Regional Women's League, Nhabe Regional Women's League, Selebi Phikwe Regional Women's League, and Tswapong Regional Women's League.

Their champions are playing for the champion's title at the DTCB Women's Football Championship Tournament. Double Action is the record-winning club of the championship by 13 known wins. They also represented Botswana 2022 the second time at the CAF Women's Champions League.  A lot of the clubs play at public or school grounds. With the season of 2022/23, the women's league once again have a big sponsor for a three-year period in form of the Diamond Trading Company Botswana (DTC).

Men's National team 
Main article: Botswana men's national football team

The men's national Team is ranked Place 148 at 2022.

Women's national team 
Main article: Botswana women's national football team

The wome's national Team is ranked Place 151 at 2022.

References